The iwame trout or markless trout is a variety of salmonid fish inhabiting some fresh waters of Japan. It is an intra-specific mutant morph of the masu salmon (Oncorhynchus masou) that is characterized by a lack of the lateral spot marks typical of the young fish in most populations. The iwame is a stream-resident morph that does not migrate to the sea. It occurs together with the standard phenotype in some populations. This morph is recessively inherited.

This morph occurs in the amago subspecies (Oncorhynchus masou ishikawae) in Western Japan, and apparently also in the nominate subspecies yamame (Oncorhynchus masou masou), if these are not identical.

The morph was scientifically described as a distinct species Oncorhynchus iwame in 1961 by Kimura & Nakamura. In the 2000s, the iwame morph was shown to occur as a polymorphism in random mating populations of O. masou, and is no more thought to have taxonomical value.

References
 Kano, Y., Shimizu, Y., Kondou, K. 2006. Sympatric, simultaneous, and random mating between markless trout (iwame; Oncorhynchus iwame) and red-spotted masu salmon (amago; Oncorhynchus masou ishikawae). Zoological Science 23:71-77. 
 Kano, Y., Kondou, K., Shimizu, Y. 2009. Present status and conservation of the markless forms of stream-resident masu salmon Oncorhynchus masou (the so-called 'iwame') in Japanese mountain streams. Ichthyological Research 57:78-84 

Oncorhynchus
Freshwater fish of Japan
Taxonomy articles created by Polbot